Christopher John Dressel (born February 7, 1961 in Placentia, California) is a former professional American football player who played tight end for ten seasons in the National Football League, mainly for the Houston Oilers and New York Jets. After his football career, Chris pursued a real estate career in San Francisco.

References 

1961 births
Living people
People from Placentia, California
American football tight ends
Stanford Cardinal football players
Houston Oilers players
San Francisco 49ers players
Sportspeople from Orange County, California
Cleveland Browns players
Kansas City Chiefs players
New York Jets players
Players of American football from California
National Football League replacement players